Rosemary Sharp is an American country music singer. Between 1987 and 1988, Sharp released four singles on Canyon Creek Records, including "If You're Going to Tell Me Lies" which peaked at 67 and "Real Good Heartache" which peaked at 76. Three of her songs reached the Top 20 on the RPM Country Tracks chart in Canada. Her single "Didn't You Go and Leave Me" is included in the collection of the National Museum of American History.

Discography

Singles

References

American women country singers
Living people
Singers from Texas
People from Fort Worth, Texas
Songwriters from Texas
Country musicians from Texas
Year of birth missing (living people)
21st-century American women